Sandakzehi may refer to:
 Sandakzehi-ye Bala
 Sandakzehi-ye Pain